Abacetus setifer is a species of ground beetle in the subfamily Pterostichinae. It was described by Tschitscherine in 1903.

References

setifer
Beetles described in 1903